John Andrew Mackin (né Macknowski; January 7, 1923) is a Russian-born American former professional basketball player. He played in the National Basketball League (NBL) and National Basketball Association (NBA) for the Syracuse Nationals franchise as the team moved from the NBL into the NBA.

Macknowski played college basketball for the Seton Hall Pirates where he started as a freshman in the 1941–42 season and then served three years of military service during World War II. He returned to the Pirates and played from 1945 to 1948.

Personal life
After his playing career, Macknowski worked as an English, history and philosophy teacher.

He changed his surname from Macknowski to Mackin in 1952. He has three daughters with his wife, Olga, who predeceased him in December 2016, aged 90. As of September 2017, Mackinowski, then 94, resided at a retirement village in Morristown, Tennessee. He turned 100 in 2023.

Career statistics

NBA

Source

Regular season

Playoffs

References

1923 births
Living people
American Basketball League (1925–1955) players
American men's basketball players
Basketball players from Jersey City, New Jersey
Lincoln High School (New Jersey) alumni
Forwards (basketball)
Guards (basketball)
Rochester Royals draft picks
Seton Hall Pirates men's basketball players
Syracuse Nationals players
Soviet emigrants to the United States

American centenarians
Men centenarians